This article lists the colonial governors of the Marshall Islands, from the establishment of the German colonial presence during the 1885 Carolines Question (as part of German New Guinea), through the American capture of the islands during World War II, until the official establishment of the autonomous Government of the Marshall Islands in 1979 (within the American-administered TTPI).

List

(Dates in italics indicate de facto continuation of office)

On 1 May 1979, Marshall Islands achieved autonomy within the Trust Territory of the Pacific Islands (TTPI).  For a list of heads of state after autonomy, see President of the Marshall Islands.

See also
 Politics of the Marshall Islands
 President of the Marshall Islands
 Marshall Islands–United States relations
 Compact of Free Association
 Pacific Proving Grounds

References

External links
World Statesmen.org: Marshall Islands

Colonial governors
Colonial governors
Marshall Islands
Foreign relations of the Marshall Islands
Colonial governors
19th century in the Marshall Islands
20th century in the Marshall Islands